Shahe station is a station on the Changping Line of the Beijing Subway. The station was opened on December 30, 2010.

Location 
The station is located in Shahe Area, Changping District, Beijing. It is on the south side of the T junction of Baisha Road and Nanfeng Road.

Station Layout 
The station has an elevated island platform.

Exits 
The station has 4 exits, lettered A1, A2, B1, and B2. Exits A1 and B2 are accessible.

References

External links

Beijing Subway stations in Changping District
Railway stations in China opened in 2010